Chiriaco Summit Airport  is a county-owned public-use airport located one nautical mile (1.85 km) northeast of the central business district of Chiriaco Summit, in Riverside County, California, United States.

The airport is maintained as a functioning airport for emergency purposes and recreational VFR use by the Riverside County government. Some west coast aero clubs use the airport (and nearby restaurant) as a "destination" site for annual weekend competitions.

History 
The airport was opened in April 1943 as Shavers Summit Army Airfield  and was used by the United States Army Air Forces Fourth Air Force as a training base during World War II. At the end of the war the airfield was determined to be no longer needed by the military and turned over to the local government for civil use.

Facilities and aircraft 

It has one runway designated 6/24 with an asphalt surface measuring 4,600 by 50 feet (1,402 x 15 m). For the 12-month period ending November 30, 2006, the airport had 6,000 general aviation aircraft operations, an average of 16 per day.

See also 

 California World War II Army Airfields
 Desert Training Center

References

External links 
 George S. Patton Memorial Museum and Chiriaco Summit, CA Airport

Airfields of the United States Army Air Forces in California
World War II airfields in the United States
Military facilities in the Mojave Desert
Airports in Riverside County, California